Udamina leprieurii is a species of beetle in the family Cerambycidae, and the only species in the genus Udamina. It was described by Thomson in 1868.

References

Forsteriini
Beetles described in 1868